Bolbae or Bolbai was a town of ancient Caria, mentioned by Stephanus of Byzantium. Bolbae was a polis (city-state) and member of the Delian League. It appears in the Athenian tribute lists and paid an annual tribute of 17 drachmae, 1 obol.
 
Its site is unlocated.

References

Populated places in ancient Caria
Former populated places in Turkey
Lost ancient cities and towns
Members of the Delian League
Greek city-states